Saline High School may refer to:

 Saline High School (Louisiana), Saline, Louisiana
 Saline High School (Michigan), Saline, Michigan
 Saline Liberty School, Saline, Michigan, originally named Saline High School

See also
 Grand Saline High School, Grand Saline, Texas